Eucoenogenes is a genus of moths belonging to the subfamily Olethreutinae of the family Tortricidae.

Species
Eucoenogenes ancyrota (Meyrick, 1907)
Eucoenogenes atripalpa Razowski, 2009
Eucoenogenes bicucullus Pinkaew, 2005
Eucoenogenes melanancalis (Meyrick, 1937)
Eucoenogenes sipanga Razowski, 2009
Eucoenogenes teliferana (Christoph, 1882)
Eucoenogenes vaneeae Pinkaew, 2005

See also
List of Tortricidae genera

References

External links
tortricidae.com

 
Eucosmini
Tortricidae genera
Taxa named by Edward Meyrick